Jordi Morales García (born 17 November 1985 in Esparreguera) is a class 7 table tennis player from Spain.

Personal 
In 2013, he was awarded the silver Real Orden al Mérito Deportivo.

Table tennis 
He played table tennis at the 2000, 2004, 2008 and 2012 Summer Paralympics.  In 2004, he finished third in the class 7 singles table tennis event. In 2012, he finished second in the team class 6–8 event.

References

External links 
 
 

1985 births
Spanish male table tennis players
Table tennis players at the 2000 Summer Paralympics
Table tennis players at the 2004 Summer Paralympics
Table tennis players at the 2008 Summer Paralympics
Table tennis players at the 2012 Summer Paralympics
Paralympic table tennis players of Spain
Medalists at the 2004 Summer Paralympics
Medalists at the 2012 Summer Paralympics
Paralympic medalists in table tennis
Paralympic silver medalists for Spain
Paralympic bronze medalists for Spain
People from Esparreguera
Sportspeople from the Province of Barcelona
Living people
Sportsmen from Catalonia
Table tennis players at the 2020 Summer Paralympics